Club Deportivo Mariscal Miller (sometimes referred as Mariscal Miller) is a Peruvian football club, playing in the city of Tacna, Tacna, Peru.

History
The Club Deportivo Mariscal Miller was founded on January 18, 1961.

In the 2003 Copa Perú, the club classified to the Regional Stage, but was eliminated by Deportivo Enersur.

In the 2004 Copa Perú, the club classified to the Regional Stage, but was eliminated by Juventus Corazón.

In the 2006 Copa Perú, the club classified to the Regional Stage, but was eliminated by Total Clean.

In the 2009 Copa Perú, the club classified to the Regional Stage, but was eliminated by Unión Minas de Orcopampa.

In the 2017 Copa Perú, the club classified to the National Stage,  but was eliminated when finished in 40th place.

Honours

Regional
Región VIII: 
Runner-up (1): 2003

Liga Departamental de Tacna:
Winners (9): 1968, 1969, 1976, 1977, 1978, 2003, 2004, 2009, 2011
Runner-up (2): 2006, 2017

Liga Provincial de Tacna:
Winners (5): 1976, 1978, 2003, 2009, 2011
Runner-up (3): 2015, 2017, 2018

Liga Distrital de Tacna:
Winners (9): 1968, 1969, 1976, 2008, 2009, 2010, 2011, 2015, 2016
Runner-up (2): 2017, 2018

See also
List of football clubs in Peru
Peruvian football league system

References

External links

Football clubs in Peru
Association football clubs established in 1961
1961 establishments in Peru